The  was a contest between Toshiaki Mukai (3 June 1912 – 28 January 1948) and Tsuyoshi Noda (1912 – 28 January 1948), two Japanese Army officers, which took place during the Japanese invasion of China. The goal of the contest was to see who could kill 100 people the fastest while using a sword. The two officers were later executed on charges of war crimes and crimes against humanity for their involvement. Since that time, the historicity of the event has been hotly contested, often by Japanese nationalists or negationist historians who seek to invalidate the historiography of the Nanjing Massacre.

The issue first emerged from a series of wartime Japanese newspaper articles, which celebrated the "heroic" killing of the Chinese by two Japanese officers, who were engaged in a competition to see who could kill the most first. The issue was revived in the 1970s, which sparked a larger controversy over Japanese war crimes in China, in particular, the Nanjing Massacre.

The original accounts printed in the newspaper described the killings as hand-to-hand combat; however, historians have suggested that they were most likely another part of the widespread mass killings of defenseless Chinese prisoners.

Wartime accounts

The competition supposedly took place en route to Nanking, prior to the infamous Nanking Massacre, and was covered in four articles from 30 November 1937, to 13 December 1937; the last two being translated in the Japan Advertiser.

Both officers supposedly surpassed their goal during the heat of battle, making it difficult to determine which officer had actually won the contest. Therefore, (according to the journalists Asami Kazuo and Suzuki Jiro, writing in the Tokyo Nichi-Nichi Shimbun of 13 December), they decided to begin another contest with the goal of 150 kills. The Nichi Nichi headline of the story of 13 December read Incredible Record' [in the Contest to] Behead 100 People—Mukai 106 – 105 Noda—Both 2nd Lieutenants Go Into Extra Innings".

Other soldiers and historians have noted the unlikelihood of the lieutenants' alleged heroics, which entailed killing enemy after enemy in fierce hand-to-hand combat. Noda himself, on returning to his hometown, admitted this during a speech:

Actually, I didn't kill more than four or five people in hand-to-hand combat ... We'd face an enemy trench that we'd captured, and when we called out, "Ni, Lai-Lai!" (You, come here!), the Chinese soldiers were so stupid, they'd rush toward us all at once. Then we'd line them up and cut them down, from one end of the line to the other. I was praised for having killed a hundred people, but actually, almost all of them were killed in this way. The two of us did have a contest, but afterwards. I was often asked whether it was a big deal, and I said it was no big deal ...

Trial and execution
After the war, a written record of the contest found its way into the documents of the International Military Tribunal for the Far East. In 1947, the two soldiers were arrested by the U.S. Army and detained at Sugamo Prison. They were then extradited to China and tried by the Nanjing War Crimes Tribunal. On trial with the two men was Gunkichi Tanaka, a Japanese Army captain who personally killed over 300 Chinese POWs and civilians with his sword during the massacre. All three men were found guilty of atrocities committed during the Battle of Nanking and the subsequent massacre, and sentenced to death. On 28 January 1948, the three were executed by shooting at a selected spot in the mountains of the Yuhuatai District. Mukai and Noda were both 35 years old; Tanaka was 42.

Postwar accounts

In Japan, the contest was lost to the obscurity of history until 1967, when Tomio Hora (a professor of history at Waseda University) published a 118-page document pertaining to the events of Nanking. The story was unreported by the Japanese press until 1971, when Japanese journalist Katsuichi Honda brought the issue to the attention of the public with a series of articles written for Asahi Shimbun, which focused on interviews with Chinese survivors of the World War II occupation and massacres.

In Japan, the articles sparked fierce debate about the Nanking Massacre, with the veracity of the killing contest a particularly contentious point of debate. Over the following years, many authors have argued over whether the Nanking Massacre even occurred, with viewpoints on the subject also being a predictor for whether they believed the contest was a fabrication. The Sankei Shimbun and Japanese politician Tomomi Inada have publicly demanded that the Asahi and Mainichi media companies retract their wartime reporting of the contest.

In a later work, Katsuichi Honda placed the account of the killing contest into the context of its effect on Imperial Japanese forces in China. In one instance, Honda notes Japanese veteran Shintaro Uno's autobiographical description of the effect on his sword after consecutively beheading nine prisoners. Uno compares his experiences with those of the two lieutenants from the killing contest. Although he had believed the inspirational tales of hand-to-hand combat in his youth, after his own experience in the war he came to believe the killings were more likely brutal executions. Uno adds,

Whatever you say, it's silly to argue about whether it happened this way or that way when the situation is clear. There were hundreds of thousands of soldiers like Mukai and Noda, including me, during those fifty years of war between Japan and China. At any rate, it was nothing more than a commonplace occurrence during the so-called Chinese Disturbance.

In 2000, Bob Wakabayashi wrote that "the killing contest itself was a fabrication", but the controversy it created "increased the Japanese people's knowledge of the atrocity and raised their awareness of being victimizers in a war of imperialist aggression despite efforts to the contrary by conservative revisionists". Joshua Fogel has stated that to accept the newspaper account "as true and accurate requires a leap of faith that no balanced historian can make".

The Nanking Massacre Memorial in China includes a display on the contest among its many exhibits. A Japan Times article has suggested that its presence allows revisionists to "sow seeds of doubt" about the accuracy of the entire collection.

One of the swords allegedly used in the contest is on display at the Republic of China Armed Forces Museum in Taipei, Taiwan.

The contest is depicted in the 1994 film Black Sun: The Nanking Massacre, as well as the 2009 film, John Rabe.

Lawsuit
In April 2003, the families of Toshiaki Mukai and Tsuyoshi Noda filed a defamation suit against Katsuichi Honda, Kashiwa Shobō, the Asahi Shimbun, and the Mainichi Shimbun, requesting ¥36,000,000 in compensation. On 23 August 2005, Tokyo District Court Judge Akio Doi dismissed the suit on the grounds that "The contest did occur, and was not fabricated by the media." The judge stated that, although the original newspaper article included "false elements", the officers admitted that they had raced to kill 100 people and "It is difficult to say it was fiction." Some evidence of killing Chinese POWs (not hand-to-hand fighting) were shown by the defendants, and the court admitted the possibilities of killing POWs by sword. In December 2006, the Supreme Court of Japan upheld the decision of the Tokyo District Court.

See also
Nanking (1937－1945)
Petar Brzica
Tameshigiri
Japanese war crimes

References

Citations

Bibliography 

 .
 .

Further reading

In English
Nanking (1937－1945)
  (English translation of the newspaper articles on the contest)
In Japanese
Full text of all articles pertaining to the event
百人斬り訴訟で東京地裁は遺族の敗訴だが朝日新聞記事と東京日日新聞記事は違う点を無視の報道
Decision of the Tokyo District Court (full text)
Mochizuki's Memories "Watashi no Shina-jihen" (私の支那事変), one of the exhibits in evidence at the Tokyo District Court, which revealed Noda and Mukai beheaded Chinese farmers with their swords during the killing contest.

Japan in World War II
Japanese war crimes
Competitions in Japan
Nanjing Massacre
Second Sino-Japanese War
20th-century mass murder in China
1937 murders in China